Albanian Supercup 2001 is the eighth edition of the Albanian Supercup since its establishment in 1989. The match was contested between the Albanian Cup 2001 winners KF Tirana and the 2000–01 Albanian Superliga champions KF Vllaznia.

Match details

See also
 2000–01 Albanian Superliga
 2000–01 Albanian Cup

References

RSSSF.com

2001
Supercup
Albanian Supercup, 2001
Albanian Supercup, 2001